Sixtus Josef Parzinger (21 December 1931 – 25 February 2023) was an Austrian-born Chilean Roman Catholic prelate. He was bishop of Villarrica from 2001 to 2009.

References

1931 births
2023 deaths
Austrian Roman Catholic bishops
20th-century Roman Catholic bishops in Chile
21st-century Roman Catholic bishops in Chile
Bishops appointed by Pope Paul VI
People from Villarrica